Synanthedon mesochoriformis is a moth of the family Sesiidae. It was discovered in South Africa.

References

Endemic moths of South Africa
Sesiidae
Moths of Africa
Moths described in 1856